Nangal Choudhary is a town and tehsil (administrative division) in District Mahendragarh at Narnaul in India. A famous personality, Baba Ramdev, belongs to the village (Said Alipur) which is a part of this region.

History 
During the Mughal rule, Narnaul was a flourishing town.

Nawab Shah Quli Khan, a governor of Akbar, erected many splendid buildings at Narnaul, laid out several gardens and built a mausoleum for 500 years before to Vikram Samwat 1962, uada choudhary (JAT)  took possession of Nangal Choudhary. After some time, he included Sitaram Brahamin with him in land possession. Both of them distributed the land among their children. By the time, they also included BHRAMIN AND RJAPUT in village land occupation equal a

After some time four casts took equal possession, namelATis, Brahmins, Prajapatis, and Rajputs. They ruled and charged recovery for this land in cultivation.

Initially when Udai rehabilitated this village and named as Udai Nangal. But it is not known when this village became known as Nangal Choudhary. This village was never nonpopulated and never shifted to any place. It is situated on the same location since history.

Then Jhajhar Nawab has put this village on Batai and recovered its charges. In samwat 1914, an English officer has given this land on Rs 1525 on contract basis for one year. But after 1915 samwat, Mahraja Patiyala has cancelled this contract and started recovery in his own way. edited by Nangal Choudhary

Geography
Presently, Nangal Choudhary is one of district block headquarters situated in southern part of the district and touches the districts of Alwar, Sikar and Jaipur of Rajasthan state. The upland tract unit covers the area between northern Narnaul and Nangal Choudhary Hills in the Narnaul Tehsil. A desert upland, situated between 284 and 302 meters above the mean sea level belongs to the Aravali System. Nangal Choudhary hills in Narnaul tehsil near Haryana-Rajasthan boundary are one of the many geographical features of Independent hill ranges in Mahendragarh in Narnaul Tehsils. East of the Kasaunti or Krishnawati river stream, the elevation of 626 m and relative relief of 160 m is found near Mukandpura village. North-west and south of Narnaul town, rounded hillocks and elliptical hills are prominent features of the landscape in the sandy terrain between the Dohan and Kasaunti streams. The elevation of the conical hillock near Thanwas- Nayan village is the highest, 652 m.
Recently Nangal Choudhary is granted status of Tehsil and Municipal Committee by Haryana Chief Minister Mr. Bhupender Singh Hooda during a public rally held at Nangal Choudhary on 6 May 2012.

Integrated Multimodel Logistics Hub (IMLH)

The largest logistics hub in North India 
Integrated Multimodel Logistics Hub, Nangal Chaudhary (IMLHNC or IMLH Nangal Chaudhary), 1,100 acre US$3.3. billion project along the railway in Haryana is part of Delhi–Mumbai Industrial Corridor Project (DMIC) on Western Dedicated Freight Corridor (WDFC), that is on track to be completed on time by December 2017 (infrastructure and plot of land ready to be allocated to investors, as of April 2017). Among such investors, Dr. B. Ravi Pillai, owner of RP Group and the richest Indian billionaire in Dubai and Middle East which employ over 70,000 employees, offered to CM of Haryana in December 2017 to invest in logistics company in Integrated Multimodel Logistics Hub, Nangal Chaudhary (North India's largest logistics hub) and in Prime Minister's Housing for All (PMAY) low-cost urban housing in 3 Industrial Model Townships (IMT) along Delhi Western Peripheral Expressway in IMT Bahadurgarh, IMT Kundli, Sonipat and IMT Manesar with construction to be completed within 1 year.

Synergy with DMIC
The Delhi Mumbai Industrial Corridor Project (DMIC) is a US$100 billion India-Japan state-sponsored industrial development project of the Government of India on the Western Dedicated Freight Corridor (WDFC), aimed at developing 7 Investment Regions of 250 sq km and 13 industrial areas across six states (Delhi, Western Uttar Pradesh, Southern Haryana, Eastern Rajasthan, Eastern Gujarat, Western Maharashtra and Madhya Pradesh) in India by boosting major expansion of Infrastructure and Industry, including industrial clusters and rail, road, port and air connectivity in the states along the route of the Corridor. This would open a floodgate of opportunities along several parts of Golden Quadrilateral such as Delhi-Mumbai NH-48, NH-2, NH-1 and NH -10 for developing industrial, urban and supporting infrastructure through public-private initiatives. More than 60% area of Haryana is under DMIC project, which is extended up to 150 km on both sides of the alignment of DMIC.

Manesar-Bawal-Nangal Chaudhary is one of the investment regions selected for development in the first phase of ambitious DMIC. 
 Manesar has more than US$10 billion investment in several large multinational industries, specially from Japan, such as Maruti Suzuki and Toshiba Eco City. Aadhar's national Data Center is also located here. 
 Bawal has been evolved as a mega industrial growth hub where HSIIDC has allotted 78 Industrial manufacturing plots to 78 medium and large scale projects multi-national companies here with capital investment of around US$4.18 billion (2016), including Harley-Davidson, Asahi India, Musashi Auto Parts India, POSCO steel, Kansai Nerolac Paints, YKK, Euothern Hema, Keihin Corporation, Atlas Copco, Ahresty Wilmington Corporation, Caparo Maruti and Haco Group along with many Indian companies such as Omax Corporation, Rico Auto Corporation, Minda Auto Group, Rubyco Modular Furniture International, Tenneco Automotive India, Continental Equipment and Multicolor Steels, Caparo power plant, etc. have set up plants. 
 Nangal Chaudhary, with USD$3.3 billion phase-I investment, is North India's largest logistics and warehousing hub.

Transport

Roads
Road: Nangal Choudhary is connected by road to Kotputli 28 km, Jaipur 138 km, Narnaul 22 km, Behror 25 km, Neem ka Thana 43 km, these and other cities of Haryana and Rajasthan.
Newly declared National Highway No. 148B from Rajasthan Border (Kotputli) to Bhatinda (Punjab) passing through Nangal Chaudhary

Bus
Narnaul, Nizampur, Behror, Mohindergarh, Jaipur and Kotputli connected.

Rail
Railway: Narnaul 22 km and Nizampur 14 km, is located on the Delhi-Ringas-Abu Road-Ahmedabad-Mumbai railway track. Only seven trains run on this section. The track is a part of Western Dedicated Freight Corridor.
Government of India have confirmed proposal to develop IMLH at Nangal Chaudhary under DMICDC project, this will stimulate industrial growth in the region.

Airport
Airport: Indra Gandhi International Airport, Delhi is the nearest international and domestic airport; the second nearest international and domestic airport is Jaipur.

Distances to cities
Distances to cities: Mahendragarh 47 km, Rewari 76 km, Behror 25 km, Narnaul 22 Km, Alwar 80 km, Jhunjhunu 90 km, Gurgaon 110 km, Delhi 140 km, Jaipur 138 km, Chandigarh 397 km.

Temple and Gosalla 

Temples in Nangal Choudhary :-  

Baba Mukandas Mandir

Sahid Baba Mandir , Ganwari Jat

Baba Bakshidas mandir ( Said Alipur)

Aarya sabha ( Said Alipur)

Mata Aasawari mandir (nangal choudhary)

Resources
In the vicinity of the village, limestone is found in the riverbed of Krishnawati river and village Dostpur. There are mines of various ores. In village Gulawala, quartz (Phelsphar) is found in hills. In neighboring village Aantri Biharipur, some other rare stones are found. In Nizampur, the iron ore is present in abundance. Recently illegal stone crushers Mushroomed in and around this constituency.

References

Cities and towns in Mahendragarh district